Boylston is a former unincorporated community in Montgomery County, Alabama, United States, that is now a neighborhood within the city of Montgomery, between the city's downtown and the Tallapoosa River.

History
The community was likely named after a local family. A post office opened under the name Boylston in 1827.

References

Encyclopædia Britannica Atlas, 1958 Edition, Plate 72.

Geography of Montgomery, Alabama
Neighborhoods in Alabama
Unincorporated communities in Montgomery County, Alabama
Unincorporated communities in Alabama